The Murtalbahn (literally translated, the Mur Valley Railway) is a  narrow-gauge railway largely located in the state of Styria in Austria. The line runs along the valley of the River Mur from the market town of Unzmarkt through Murau to Tamsweg, which is just over the Styrian border in the state of Salzburg.

History 
The railway line between Unzmarkt and Mauterndorf was opened in October 1894.

In March 1973 the public passenger traffic was stopped on the section between Tamsweg and Mauterndorf. This section is operated today by Club 760 under the name Taurachbahn as a museum railway.

Special steam trains and amateur locomotive trips still operate over the route.

Accidents and incidents
On 9 July 2021, railcar VT 32 was derailed due to a fallen tree, with one carriage ending up on its side in the Mur. Seventeen people, mostly young school-age children, were injured.

Operation 

Five diesel-electric railcars, introduced in 1981, are used to operate a service every two hours over the line. In the summer months the STLB operates weekend steam-hauled services between Murau, where the main workshop are, and Tamsweg. 
Goods trains still operate on the railway, with trains hauled by diesel locomotives VL 14 and 15, built in 1966. Timber and petroleum tankers are the major goods transported.

The STLB invested in the railway, and the infrastructure is maintained to the standard of standard gauge mainline routes. There are good positions for photography by railway enthusiasts along the whole route, particularly in the valley between Madling and Tamsweg.

Museum 
A museum is maintained in the locomotive shed at Frojach Katschtal station by Club 760.

Fleet

References

Sources
 Steiermärkische Landesbahnen (Herausgeber): Das Buch der Murtalbahn. Eigenverlag, 1994, 
 Walter Kroboth, J.O.Slezak, H.Sternhart: Schmalspurig durch Österreich. Slezak, Wien 41991, 
 Joseph O. Slezak, Hans Sternhart: Renaissance der Schmalspurbahn in Österreich. Slezak, Wien 1986, 
 Markus Strässle: Schmalspurbahn-Aktivitäten in Österreich. Slezak, Wien 1997, 
 Markus Strässle: Lokalbahnen in der Steiermark. Zeunert, Gifhorn 1995,

External links

 Murtalbahn page from STLB web site (in German)

Railway lines opened in 1894
760 mm gauge railways in Austria